Burlington may refer to:

Places

Canada

Geography
 Burlington, Newfoundland and Labrador
 Burlington, Nova Scotia
 Burlington, Ontario, the most populous city with the name "Burlington"
 Burlington, Prince Edward Island
 Burlington Bay, now known as Hamilton Harbour, Ontario, Canada
 Burlington Street (Hamilton, Ontario), an expressway/arterial road

Electoral districts
 Burlington (electoral district), a federal electoral district in Ontario, Canada
 Burlington (provincial electoral district), a provincial electoral district in Ontario, Canada
 Burlington South, was the name of a provincial electoral district in Ontario, Canada

England
Bridlington in Yorkshire, previously known as "Burlington"
Burlington, a codename for Central Government War Headquarters
Burlington, a small hamlet in East Shropshire lying along the A5 near Telford
 Burlington Estate, Mayfair, London, UK
 Burlington House, Mayfair, London, UK

United States
 Burlington, Colorado
 Burlington, Connecticut
 Burlington, Illinois
 Burlington, Indiana
 Burlington, Iowa
 Burlington, Kansas
 Burlington, Kentucky
 Burlington, Maine
 Burlington, Massachusetts
 Burlington, Michigan
 Burlington, New Jersey
 Burlington, New York
 Burlington, North Carolina, the most populous U.S. city with this name
 Burlington, North Dakota
 Burlington, Ohio, a census-designated place in Lawrence County
 Burlington, Fulton County, Ohio, an unincorporated community

 Burlington, Oklahoma
 Burlington, Linn County, Oregon
 Burlington, Multnomah County, Oregon
 Burlington, Pennsylvania
 Burlington, Texas
 Burlington (Nashville, Tennessee), a demolished historic mansion
 Burlington, Vermont, most populous city in Vermont
 Burlington (Barboursville, Virginia), a historic plantation house
 Burlington (Petersburg, Virginia), a historic plantation house
 Burlington, Washington
 Burlington, West Virginia
 Burlington (city), Wisconsin
 Burlington (town), Wisconsin
 Burlington, Wyoming
 Burlington County, New Jersey
 Burlington Flats, New York, a hamlet in Ostego County, New York
 South Burlington, Vermont

Brands and enterprises
 Burlington (department store), an American department store retailer formerly known as Burlington Coat Factory
 Burlington Arcade,  a covered shopping arcade in London
 Burlington Company, a group of eight investors from Burlington, New Jersey that were active in the 1770s
 Burlington Industries, a diversified American fabric maker
 Burlington Northern Santa Fe Corporation, an American railroad
 Burlington Resources, an American oil and gas company that was acquired by ConocoPhillips in 2006
 Burlington Slate Quarries, a British quarry that produces a characteristic blue grey slate

Arts, entertainment, and media
 "Burlington Bertie", an English music hall song of 1900 associated with Vesta Tilley
 Burlington Post, the local newspaper of Burlington, Ontario, Canada
 The Burlington Free Press, the daily newspaper of Burlington, Vermont, U.S.
 The Burlington Magazine, a monthly magazine

Sports
 Burlington Bees, an American Class A minor league baseball team
 Burlington Braves, a Canadian junior football league team
 Burlington Chiefs, a Canadian junior "A" box lacrosse team
 Burlington Cougars, a Canadian Tier II Junior "A" ice hockey team
 Burlington Royals, an American minor league baseball team

Transportation
 Burlington Bay James N. Allan Skyway, a bridge between the Ontario municipalities of Burlington and Hamilton in Canada
 Burlington Cars, a British motor vehicle manufacturer
 Burlington Executive Airport, in Burlington, Ontario, Canada
 Burlington GO Station, a train and bus station in Burlington, Ontario, Canada
 Burlington International Airport, the largest airport in Vermont
 Burlington station (Iowa), an Amtrak station
 Burlington station (North Carolina), an Amtrak station
 Burlington Union Station (Vermont), a rail station serving Vermont Railway and Amtrak 
 Burlington Transit
 Chicago, Burlington and Quincy Railroad, a railroad that operated in the midwestern United States, one of the predecessors of BNSF.
 Chobham armour, a type of vehicle armour also known as Burlington

Ships
HMS Burlington, the name of two ships of the Royal Navy
USS Burlington (PF-51), a United States Navy patrol frigate in commission from 1944 to 1945 and from 1951 to 1952

Other uses
 Burlington (UK), an immense nuclear bunker
 Burlington College, in Burlington, Vermont
 Earl of Burlington, a title in the peerage of the United Kingdom

See also
 Burlington Historic District (disambiguation)
 Burlington Junction (disambiguation)
 Burlington Mall (disambiguation)
 Burlington Township (disambiguation)
 New Burlington, Ohio (disambiguation)
 West Burlington (disambiguation)